Wiktor Teofil Gomulicki (17 October 1848, Ostrołęka - 14 February 1919, Warsaw) was a Polish poet, novelist and essayist. He was also a major advocate of Positivism.

Biography
He grew up in Pułtusk. He completed his primary education there in 1866, then studied law at the University of Warsaw. During a trip to Venice and Paris in 1888, he collected materials for a biography of Cyprian Kamil Norwid. From 1889 to 1890, he was the editor of the Tygodnik Powszechny (Weekly Universal).

In 1893, he was awarded an honorary diploma by the Royal Academy of Science, Letters and Fine Arts of Belgium. As a writer, he became known primarily for his historical novels and books for young adults. His novel, Wspomnienia niebieskiego mundurka (Memories of a Blue Uniform), based on his own life, is considered to be a classic of youth literature. His novel, Ciury, portrays the literary scene in Warsaw in the late 19th century. he also published several volumes of poetry and was the first to translate the works of Charles Baudelaire into Polish. 

In 1911, he was sentenced to a year in prison for writing a preface to a patriotic story by Adam Mickiewicz, but never served any time, due to a general amnesty.

His son, was a literary historian and essayist. His great-grandson, is a graphic artist and photographer.

Sources 
 Biography @ the Wirtualna Biblioteka Literatury Polskiej
 Zygmunt Gloger: Encyklopedia staropolska ilustrowana. Vol.IV. Warsaw: P. Laskauera and W. Babickiego (Eds.), 1903.

External links 

 
 A collection of his works @ Polona

1848 births
1919 deaths
Polish writers
Polish novelists
Polish poets
Polish journalists
People from Ostrołęka
People from Łomża Governorate
Polish positivists